WUBS (89.7 FM) is a radio station licensed to serve the community of South Bend, Indiana. The station is owned by ICU Ministries, Inc., and airs a religious format.

The station was assigned the WUBS call letters by the Federal Communications Commission on December 17, 1992.

References

External links
 Official Website
 

Radio stations established in 1993
1993 establishments in Indiana
Radio stations in South Bend, Indiana
Christian radio stations in Indiana